The Southern Methodist Publishing House is a historic building in Nashville, Tennessee, USA.

Location
The building is located at 810 Broadway in Nashville, the county seat of Davidson County, Tennessee. It is located on the corner of Broadway and Ninth Avenue.

History
The Southern Methodist Publishing House was first established by Reverend Alexander Little Page Green.

The five-storey building was completed in 1906. It was built with steel and concrete, with a limestone and brick facade. There is also a basement. It was designed in the Commercial architectural style, with Neoclassical finishes. It was built as a publishing house for the Methodist Episcopal Church, South.

In 1957, the building was converted into an annex for the University of Tennessee at Nashville. However, the university moved out of the building by the 1970s.

Architectural significance
It has been listed on the National Register of Historic Places since September 13, 1984.

References

Further reading
 
 

Buildings and structures in Nashville, Tennessee
Commercial buildings on the National Register of Historic Places in Tennessee
Chicago school architecture in the United States
University of Tennessee
Buildings and structures completed in 1906
National Register of Historic Places in Nashville, Tennessee
1906 establishments in Tennessee